Bibi is a given name, nickname and surname. It may also refer to:

 Bibi (title), a South Asian title for women
 Bibi (EP), by Bibi Zho, 2006
 Beneš-Mráz Bibi, a 1930s Czechoslovakian aircraft
 Bibi Station, a railway station in Chitose, Hokkaidō, Japan
 Bibi, a kind of Yongno, a Korean legendary creature
 Bibi (Romani cult), a Romani religious holiday
 Bilingual–bicultural education (BiBi), deaf education programs
 BiBi, a sub-unit in the media-mix project Love Live!

See also
 BB (disambiguation)
 Bebe (disambiguation)
 Beebe (disambiguation)
 Beebee (disambiguation)